Oligonyx dohrnianus is a species of mantid in the family Thespidae.

References

Thespidae
Articles created by Qbugbot
Insects described in 1894